Sébastien Reichenbach (born 28 May 1989) is a Swiss cyclist, who rides for UCI ProTeam .

Since turning professional, Reichenbach has taken two career victories – the 2013 Trofeo Matteotti and the 2019 Swiss National Road Race Championships.

Major results
Source: 

2011
 3rd Overall Grand Prix Chantal Biya
 10th Overall Tour du Gévaudan Languedoc-Roussillon
2012
 1st Züri-Metzgete amateurs
 7th Overall Oberösterreich Rundfahrt
 10th Piccolo Giro di Lombardia
2013
 1st Trofeo Matteotti
 2nd Tour de Berne
 4th Overall Tour de l'Ain
 8th Overall Tour of Britain
2014
 9th Brabantse Pijl
2015
 2nd Road race, National Road Championships
2016
 4th Overall Tirreno–Adriatico
 5th Road race, National Road Championships
 6th Tour du Doubs
2017
 7th Overall Vuelta a Andalucía
2018
 4th Time trial, National Road Championships
 4th Overall Route d'Occitanie
 5th Milano–Torino
 10th Giro dell'Emilia
2019
 1st  Road race, National Road Championships
 8th Overall Tour du Limousin
2020
 10th Overall Route d'Occitanie
2021
 2nd Overall Tour Alsace
 4th Overall Tour du Limousin
 10th Overall Vuelta a Burgos
2022
 2nd Road race, National Road Championships
 6th Overall Tour de l'Ain
 10th Mercan'Tour Classic

Grand Tour general classification results timeline

References

External links

1989 births
Living people
Swiss male cyclists
Cyclists at the 2016 Summer Olympics
Olympic cyclists of Switzerland
People from Martigny
Sportspeople from Valais